The Zechstein Limestone Formation is a geologic formation in Germany. It preserves fossils dating back to the Permian period.

See also

 List of fossiliferous stratigraphic units in Germany

References
 

Geologic formations of Germany
Geologic formations of Poland
Permian System of Europe
Permian Germany
Limestone formations